In enzymology, a choline sulfotransferase is an enzyme that catalyzes the chemical reaction

3'-phosphoadenylyl sulfate + choline  adenosine 3',5'-bisphosphate + choline sulfate

Thus, the two substrates of this enzyme are 3'-phosphoadenylyl sulfate and choline, whereas its two products are adenosine 3',5'-bisphosphate and choline sulfate.

This enzyme belongs to the family of transferases, specifically the sulfotransferases, which transfer sulfur-containing groups.  The systematic name of this enzyme class is 3'-phosphoadenylyl-sulfate:choline sulfotransferase. This enzyme is also called choline sulphokinase.  This enzyme participates in sulfur metabolism.

References

EC 2.8.2
Enzymes of unknown structure